The New Eurasian Land Bridge, also called the Second or New Eurasian Continental Bridge, is the southern counterpart to the Eurasian Land Bridge and runs through China and Central Asia with possible plans for expansion into South and West Asia. The Eurasian Land Bridge system is important as an overland rail link between China and Europe, with transit between the two via Central Asia and Russia. In the light of the Russia-Ukraine war, China halted further investments in the part of the bridge that was planned to go through Russia.

Routes

Due to a break-of-gauge between standard gauge used in China and the Russian gauge used in the former Soviet Union countries, containers must be physically transferred from Chinese to Kazakh railway cars at Dostyk on the Chinese–Kazakh border and again at the Belarus–Poland border where the standard gauge used in western Europe begins. This is done with truck-mounted cranes. The exact route used to connect the two cities is not always specified in Chinese media reports, but appears to usually refer to the route which passes through Kazakhstan.

All rail freight from China across the Eurasian Land Bridge must pass north of the Caspian Sea through Russia at some point. A proposed alternative would pass through Turkey and Bulgaria, but any route south of the Caspian Sea must pass through Iran. A Finnish company has started a route from China via Kazakhstan that crosses the Caspian Sea by ship to Azerbaijan then by rail to Georgia and across the Black Sea to Romania and the rest of Europe. The new route bypasses Russia, Ukraine and Belarus.

Kazakhstan's President Nursultan Nazarbayev urged Eurasian and Chinese leaders at the 18th Shanghai Cooperation Organisation to construct the Eurasian high-speed railway (EHSRW) following a Beijing-Astana-Moscow-Berlin.

On 7 November 2019 the first Chinese freight train through the Marmaray tunnel to Europe ran, from Xi'an using a Chinese locomotive. This demonstrated a China-to-Turkey transportation time reduced from a month to 12 days, and is part of the Iron Silk Road.

See also 
 Trans-Eurasia Logistics
 Yiwu–Madrid railway line
 Yiwu–London railway line
 North–South Transport Corridor
 Eurasian Land Bridge

References

Notes

Print

Web

External links and further reading
 Multimedia The New York Times

Rail transport in Russia
Rail transport in the Russian Far East
Economic integration
Transnationalism
Rail transport in Asia
Rail transport in Europe
Rail transport in China
Rail transport in Kazakhstan
Rail cooperatives
Rail freight transport
International railway lines
International railway lines in Asia
International railway lines in Europe
Passenger rail transport
Belt and Road Initiative